Miguel Angel Cerda Silva (born 27 December 1969 in Valdivia) is a Chilean rower.

Notes

References

External links
 
 
 

1969 births
Living people
Chilean male rowers
Olympic rowers of Chile
People from Valdivia
Rowers at the 2000 Summer Olympics
Rowers at the 2007 Pan American Games
Rowers at the 2011 Pan American Games
World Rowing Championships medalists for Chile
Pan American Games medalists in rowing
Pan American Games gold medalists for Chile
Pan American Games bronze medalists for Chile
Rowers at the 1999 Pan American Games
Rowers at the 2003 Pan American Games
Medalists at the 2007 Pan American Games
21st-century Chilean people